John Searle Tenney (January 21, 1793 – August 23, 1869), of Norridgewock, Maine, was a justice of the Maine Supreme Judicial Court from October 23, 1841, to October 23, 1862, serving as chief justice from October 23, 1855, to October 23, 1862.

Born at Rowley, Massachusetts, Tenney graduated from Bowdoin College in 1816 and read law to gain admission to the bar in 1820. He died in Norridgewock, Maine.

References

1793 births
1869 deaths
People from Rowley, Massachusetts
People from Norridgewock, Maine
Bowdoin College alumni
Justices of the Maine Supreme Judicial Court
19th-century American judges